Ora Denise Allen (July 16, 1934 – January 8, 2018), known by the stage name Denise LaSalle, was an American blues, R&B and soul singer, songwriter, and record producer who, since the death of Koko Taylor, had been recognized as the "Queen of the Blues". Her husband was rapper Super Wolf.

Her best known songs were "Trapped by a Thing Called Love", "I'm So Hot" and "Down Home Blues".

Early life
LaSalle, the youngest of eight children, was born Ora Denise Allen on July 16, 1934, near Sidon, Mississippi in an area then known as The Island, to Nathaniel A. Allen Sr. and Nancy Cooper. Her family worked as sharecroppers, and she had to pick cotton and take up other paid labor to support her family.

She was raised in Belzoni from age seven and sang in church choirs for local gospel groups around Leflore County. At age 13, she moved to Chicago to live with her oldest brother.

Career
She sat in with R&B musicians and wrote songs, influenced by country music as well as the blues. Around 1963, while she was working as barmaid at the Mix's Lounge, she met Billy "The Kid" Emerson, who at that time was working for Chess Records. This resulted in a one year recording contract with Chess; however, no recording sessions were done. Later on Emerson started his own label, Tarpon, and in 1967 he recorded LaSalle on his label. The single, "A Love Reputation", was a modest regional hit.

She established an independent production company, Crajon, with her then husband Bill Jones. Her song "Trapped By a Thing Called Love" (1971) was released on Detroit-based Westbound Records. This reached #1 on the national R&B chart and #13 on the Billboard Hot 100 chart. The song ranked at #85 on the 1971 year-end chart. A RIAA gold disc award was made on November 30, 1971 for a million sales. Reviewing her 1972 debut album of the same name, Robert Christgau wrote in Christgau's Record Guide: Rock Albums of the Seventies (1981): "LaSalle seems to be a songwriter first and a singer second, which may be why there's a certain professional anonymity about her unusual moods. But the voice is there—sensual, warm, even wise, ideal for [producer] Willie Mitchell's meditative Memphis funk. And because she's a pretty good songwriter, just about every one of these twelve tracks offers its professional pleasures."

She also wrote successful follow-ups, "Now Run and Tell That" and "Man Sized Job", which made #3 and number 4 in the R&B top ten and also charted in the Hot 100. Her early hits were recorded at the Hi recording studios in Memphis, operated by Mitchell, using the best southern session players. She continued to have hits and made three albums on the Westbound label.

At 1976 she moved to Jackson, Tennessee and signed a contract with ABC Records. On ABC she had another hit, "Love Me Right" (#10 R&B, #80 pop). ABC was taken over by MCA, and LaSalle made three albums for MCA. Her 1979 album include "Do Ya Think I'm Sexy" and she released "I'm So Hot" album in 1980. Super Wolf recorded rap song "Super Wolf Can Do It" also. She continued to perform live and to produce. Her co-penned song "Married, But Not to Each Other" was included on the 1979 compilation album The Best of Barbara Mandrell.

In 1982 LaSalle signed as songwriter for the Malaco label, where she wrote songs for Z.Z. Hill among others. She was then persuaded to also record herself; this resulted in the album Lady in the Street in 1983. She continued to record for Malaco for 15 years, and released a string of critically acclaimed albums, starting with Lady in the Street (1983) and Right Place, Right Time (1984). Her R&B, soul blues, and soul songs were played on urban radio stations in southern states. In 1985, she enjoyed her only recognition in the UK Singles Chart when her cover version of Rockin' Sidney's "My Toot Toot" reached #6.

She appeared at the 1984 and 1993 versions of the Long Beach Blues Festival. In 1993, she also performed at the San Francisco Blues Festival. Her album, Smokin' in Bed (1997), sold well.

LaSalle has in interviews stated that during the Westbound and ABC/MCA years she was free to record any song she liked, but at Malaco she was more limited. Malaco was a blues label, and wanted her to record mainly 'hard blues'.

After the Malaco years, LaSalle started her own label Ordena, and released a few albums, including God's Got My Back which is a gospel album, and This Real Woman (2-CD set) which is a mixture of everything, it includes country, R&B, blues and pop.

In 2002 LaSalle was again recording for a new label, this time for Ecko Records, a small Memphis-based soul-blues label, the first album was Still the Queen.

After more than a decade away, she returned to Malaco to release an album in 2010, titled 24 Hour Woman.

In 2011, she was inducted into the Blues Hall of Fame.

LaSalle lived with her husband, James E. Wolfe, in Jackson, where she opened a restaurant called Blues Legend Café. The restaurant was located at 436 E. Main Street, but has since closed.

Personal life and death
LaSalle married Artic Craig, a co-worker of her brother A.J. at Campbell Soup, in 1956 when she was 22. LaSalle and Craig were only together a short time, but didn't formally end the marriage until right before she married her second husbad, Bill Jones, in 1969. She and Jones divorced in 1974. Both of them collaborated in producing records, and they established an independent production company, Crajon Records. In 1977, she married James E. "Super Wolfe" Wolfe Jr. He was a disc jockey, ran several radio stations, became a preacher, and passed away in 2022. LaSalle had two children.

After suffering from heart problems, and with complications from a fall having resulted in her right leg being amputated in October 2017, LaSalle died surrounded by her family, at the age of 83, on January 8, 2018.

Legacy
In 2009, LaSalle was honored with a marker on the Mississippi Blues Trail in Belzoni.

In 2013 and 2014, LaSalle was nominated for a Blues Music Award in the 'Soul Blues Female Artist' category.

On June 6, 2015, LaSalle was inducted into the Rhythm and Blues Music Hall of Fame.

Discography

Albums

Studio and live albums
{| class="wikitable" style="text-align:center;"
|-
! rowspan="2"| Year
! rowspan="2"| Title
! colspan="3"| Chart positions
|- style="font-size:smaller;"
! width="35"| US
! width="35"| USR&B
! width="35"| USBlues
|-
| 1967
| align="left"| A Love Reputation
| —
| —
| —
|-
| 1971
| align="left"| Craving for You
| —
| —
| —
|-
| 1972
| align="left"| Trapped by a Thing Called Love
| 120
| 38
| —
|-
| 1973
| align="left"| On the Loose
| —
| 46
| —
|-
| 1975
| align="left"| Here I Am Again
| —
| —
| —
|-
| 1976
| align="left"| Second Breath
| —
| —
| —
|-
| 1977
| align="left"| The Bitch Is Bad!
| —
| 47
| —
|-
| 1978
| align="left"| Under the Influence
| —
| 58
| —
|-
| 1978
| align="left"| Shot of Love
| —
| —
| —
|-
| 1979
| align="left"| Unwrapped
| —
| 46
| —
|-
| 1980
| align="left"| I'm So Hot
| —
| —
| —
|-
| 1981
| align="left"| And Satisfaction Guaranteed
| —
| —
| —
|-
| 1983
| align="left"| A Lady in the Street
| —
| 23
| —
|-
| 1984
| align="left"| Right Place, Right Time
| —
| 38
| —
|-
| 1985
| align="left"| Love Talkin'''
| —
| 67
| —
|-
| 1986
| align="left"| Rain & Fire| —
| 48
| —
|-
| 1987
| align="left"| It's Lying Time Again| —
| —
| —
|-
| 1988
| align="left"| Hittin' Where It Hurts| —
| 61
| —
|-
| 1990
| align="left"| Still Trapped| —
| 27
| —
|-
| 1992
| align="left"| Love Me Right| —
| 73
| —
|-
| 1994
| align="left"| Still Bad| —
| —
| —
|-
| 1997
| align="left"| Smokin' in Bed| —
| 69
| 10
|-
| 1999
| align="left"| God's Got My Back| —
| —
| —
|-
| 2000
| align="left"| This Real Woman| —
| —
| —
|-
| 2001
| align="left"| There's No Separation| —
| —
| —
|-
| 2002
| align="left"| Still the Queen| —
| —
| —
|-
| 2004
| align="left"| Wanted| —
| —
| —
|-
| 2007
| align="left"| Pay Before You Pump| —
| —
| 14
|-
| 2010
| align="left"| 24 Hour Woman| —
| —
| —
|-
| 2019
| align="left"| Mississippi Woman Steppin' Out Live!| —
| —
| —
|-
| colspan="6" style="text-align:center; font-size:9pt;"| "—" denotes releases that did not chart.
|}

Compilation albums
 1973: Doin' It Right 1985: My Toot Toot 1989: Holdin' Hands with the Blues 2001: I Get What I Want: Best of the ABC/MCA Years 2003: My Toot Toot: The Definitive Anthology''

Singles

References

External links
 
 Allmusic.com biography

 

1934 births
2018 deaths
21st-century American singers
20th-century American singers
Singers from Mississippi
American mezzo-sopranos
Songwriters from Mississippi
Record producers from Mississippi
Soul-blues musicians
People from Sidon, Mississippi
People from Belzoni, Mississippi
People from Jackson, Tennessee
Businesspeople from Tennessee
Chess Records artists
20th-century American women singers
21st-century American women singers
American women record producers
Malaco Records artists
Mississippi Blues Trail
20th-century American businesspeople